Arthur Lincoln "Art" Andrew (June 12, 1931 – August 10, 2012) was a sailor who represented the United States Virgin Islands. He competed in the Finn event at the 1976 Summer Olympics.

References

External links
 
 

1931 births
2012 deaths
United States Virgin Islands male sailors (sport)
Olympic sailors of the United States Virgin Islands
Sailors at the 1976 Summer Olympics – Finn
Central American and Caribbean Games gold medalists for the United States Virgin Islands
Central American and Caribbean Games medalists in sailing
Competitors at the 1974 Central American and Caribbean Games
Sportspeople from St. Louis